This page is about the record label. For the Small Stone effect pedal, see Electro-Harmonix.

Small Stone Records is an American record label based in Detroit, MI.  It was founded in 1995 by Scott Hamilton and is a self-dubbed "heavy rock" label. The label has released a number of stoner rock compilation albums, as well as releases by Dozer, Los Natas, Halfway To Gone, Solace, and many others in the stoner rock, indie, blues-rock, and psychedelic genres.

History
Small Stone Records was founded in Detroit, Michigan by Scott Hamilton in 1995, who remains owner and operator. Hamilton claims he mostly started the label to put out records by friends and his favorite bands such as Big Chief, The Laughing Hyenas, Mule, and Slot. Hamilton started the label with a $5000 loan and named it after the Small Stone effects pedal made by Electro-Harmonix.

The label's first release was a single by 36-D, which had members of Big Chief, Born Without a Face, and Slot. The label's first album release was a 1995 compilation titled Detroit Rust City, which sold 1,000 copies the first week, and featured Kid Rock and Big Chief. Shortly afterward the label released Morsel's sophomore EP. In 1997 the label released an album by Perplexa, a band which included a member from WIG, who later went on to become West Indian Girl. Five Horse Johnson also signed to the label that year. The label initially featured a number of different rock genres but soon began focusing on the blues rock, psychedelic rock and stoner rock genres, and what Hamilton dubs "heavy rock."

Besides albums by groups such as  Acid King, Dozer, Greenleaf, and Los Natas, the label has released a number of stoner rock compilations. The first, Right in the Nuts: A Tribute to Aerosmith, featured covers of Aerosmith, and was released in 2000. In January 2002, the label released Sucking the 70s, a two disc collection of 1970s songs covered by stoner rock bands. In 2006, the label released the compilation Sucking the 70's - Back in the Saddle Again, which featured covers of various 1970s songs.

According to Hamilton, early on the Small Stone bands relied on networking with other bands on the label to organize tours and musical projects. In 2006, Small Stone began issuing the lost recordings of the band Slot, whose founder and guitarist had recently died. Remaining members of the band Sue Lott (bass) and Eddie Alterman (drums) were then joined by Phil Durr of Five Horse Johnson and Scott Hamilton on guitar to play at SXSW in the spring of 2007. The new reformation soon garnered Five Horse Johnson drummer Eric Miller, and formed the band Luder. Their first album, Sonoluminescence, was released on Small Stone in November 2009. Reviews dubbed the style "grunge-gaze."

The label continues to put out approximately 10 to 12 new releases a year. Small Stone's newer bands, such as Lo-Pan, Backwoods Payback, and Freedom Hawk continue to maintain busy touring schedules.

Small Stone records is sometimes referred to as the "new home" for Man's Ruin bands. Acts like Acid King, Los Natas, Dozer, Sons Of Otis, Tummler, and Men Of Porn were picked up by Small Stone after the demise of the Man's Ruin record label (Some of those earlier Man's Ruin records have since been reissued by Small Stone, most notably the albums by Dozer, Acid King, and Sons Of Otis).

Beginning in February 2014, Small Stone Records entered into a distribution agreement with Alternative Distribution Alliance.

Artists who have signed to Small Stone Records

 Abrahma
 Acid King
 All Time High
 Antler
 Asteroid
 A Thousand Knives of Fire
 Axehandle
 Backwoods Payback
 Blackwolfgoat
 Black Sleep of Kali
 Bottom
 Brain Police
 The Brought Low
 Deville
 Dixie Witch
 Dozer
 Dwellers
 Erik Larson
 Five Horse Johnson
 Fireball Ministry
 Freedom Hawk
 Gozu
 Greatdayforup
 Giant Brain
 Gideon Smith & the Dixie Damned
 The Glasspack
 Greenleaf
 Hackman
 Halfway to Gone
 Honky
 House of Broken Promises
 Infernal Overdrive
 Iota
 Ironweed
 Isaak
 It's Not Night: It's Space
 Jeremy Irons & the Ratgang Malibus
 LaChinga
 Larman Clamor
 Lo-Pan
 Lord Fowl
 Lord Sterling
 Los Natas
 Luder
 Mangoo
 Medusa Cyclone
 Mellow Bravo
 Mother of God
 Milligram
 Miss Lava
 Mog Stunt Team
 Morsel
 Mos Generator
 Neon Warship
 Nightstalker
 Novadriver
 Obiat
 The Men of Porn
 Puny Human
 Red Giant
 Roadsaw
 Roundhead
 Sasquatch
 Shame Club
 Slot
 Skånska Mord
 SNAIL
 Solace
 Soul Clique
 Sun Gods In Exile
 Supermachine
 Suplecs
 The Might Could
 The Socks
 Throttlerod
 Tia Carrera
 Tummler
 VALIS
 Whitey Morgan and the 78's
 Wo Fat
 ZUN
 36D

See also
 List of record labels

References

External links

Small Stone Records on Facebook
Small Stone Records on Last.fm

American record labels
Alternative rock record labels
Record labels established in 1995